After the War is the seventh solo studio album by the Northern Irish guitarist Gary Moore, released on 25 January 1989 by Virgin Records.

Background
Like its predecessor, Wild Frontier, After the War contains elements of Celtic music. The instrumental "Dunluce" is named after Dunluce Castle in Northern Ireland.

On "Led Clones", Ozzy Osbourne, with whom Moore had worked before the singer united with Randy Rhoads, shares lead vocals. The song pokes fun at bands such as Kingdom Come which were popular at the time, and is based on a Led Zeppelin-type sound and image. "That song was great fun," Ozzy recalled, "and it was an honour to record with Gary." The Sisters of Mercy frontman, Andrew Eldritch, provides backing vocals on the songs "After the War", "Speak for Yourself" and "Blood of Emeralds". Moore again pays tribute to the memory of his long-time friend and colleague Phil Lynott with the song "Blood of Emeralds".

After the War was Moore's last foray into conventional hard rock, and his last rock album of any kind until Dark Days in Paradise in 1997. Starting with his next album, Still Got the Blues, he primarily played blues.

Although Cozy Powell played drums on the album, he was replaced by Chris Slade for the tour, as he was set to tour with Black Sabbath, in support of the album, Headless Cross, on which he also played drums.

Track listing

Personnel
Musicians
Gary Moore – guitars, lead vocals
Neil Carter – keyboards, backing vocals
Bob Daisley – bass guitar
Cozy Powell – drums
Don Airey – keyboards on "The Messiah Will Come Again", "Running from the Storm" and "This Thing Called Love"
Laurence Cottle – bass guitar on "The Messiah Will Come Again"
Steve Piggott - sequencer bass on "Ready for Love"
Charlie Morgan – drums on "After the War"
Simon Phillips – drums on "Speak for Yourself" and "Blood of Emeralds"
Brian Downey – drums on "Emerald"
Chris Thompson – backing vocals on "After the War", "Led Clones" and "Ready for Love"; violin on "Led Clones"
Ozzy Osbourne – co-lead vocals on "Led Clones;" backing vocals on "Speak for Yourself"
Andrew Eldritch – backing vocals on "After the War", "Speak for Yourself" and "Blood of Emeralds"
Sam Brown, Miriam Stockley – backing vocals on "Ready for Love"

Production
Peter Collins – producer
Duane Baron – mixing
Ian Taylor – engineer, mixing
Steve Barnett, Stewart Young, Hard to Handle – management

Charts

Album

Singles

Sales and certifications

See also
 List of anti-war songs

References

Gary Moore albums
1989 albums
Albums produced by Peter Collins (record producer)
Virgin Records albums